Austin Robert Butler (born August 17, 1991) is an American actor. He is known for portraying Elvis Presley in the musical biopic Elvis (2022), for which he won a Golden Globe Award, a BAFTA, and received a nomination for the Academy Award for Best Actor.

Butler began his career on television, first in roles on the Disney Channel and Nickelodeon and later on teen dramas, including recurring parts on The CW's Life Unexpected (2010–2011) and Switched at Birth (2011–2012). He gained recognition for starring in The Carrie Diaries (2013–2014) and The Shannara Chronicles (2016–2017). Butler made his Broadway debut in the 2018 revival of The Iceman Cometh and played Tex Watson in Quentin Tarantino's film Once Upon a Time in Hollywood (2019).

Early life
Butler was born on August 17, 1991, in Anaheim, California, the son of Lori Anne (née Howell), an aesthetician, and David Butler. The two divorced when he was seven. He has an older sister, Ashley (born in 1986), who worked as a background actor alongside him on Ned's Declassified School Survival Guide.

When Butler was thirteen, he was approached by a representative from a background acting management company at the Orange County Fair who helped him get started in the entertainment industry. He found that he enjoyed it and soon began taking acting classes.

Butler attended public school until the seventh grade, when he left to be homeschooled to better accommodate his work schedule. He continued his homeschooling until the tenth grade and later passed the CHSPE, the state's high school equivalency diploma.

Career

2005–2011: Early career in teen sitcoms
In 2005, after working as an extra on several television series, including Unfabulous and Drake and Josh, Butler landed his first regular job as a background actor playing the role of Zippy Brewster for two seasons on Nickelodeon's Ned's Declassified School Survival Guide. His friend on the show, Lindsey Shaw, introduced him to her manager, Pat Cutler, who signed him and launched his career. From that point on, Butler began taking acting seriously as a career.

In May 2007, Butler landed a guest starring role on the Disney Channel series Hannah Montana playing the role of Derek Hanson opposite actress Miley Cyrus, and in September of that same year, he portrayed Jake Krandle in the episode "iLike Jake" on the Nickelodeon series iCarly.

In February 2008, Butler landed a main role on another Nickelodeon series, Zoey 101, playing James Garrett, the love interest of Jamie Lynn Spears's title character Zoey in the fourth season; previously, he guest starred on the same show playing the role of Danifer on the third-season episode "Quarantine". In March of that year, he appeared in an episode on the short-lived Cartoon Network sitcom, Out of Jimmy's Head, playing the role of Lance in the episode titled "Princess".

In July 2009, Butler starred in 20th Century Fox's family adventure movie Aliens in the Attic portraying Jake Pearson, alongside Ashley Tisdale, Carter Jenkins, Robert Hoffman, Kevin Nealon and Doris Roberts. In the movie, his character, along with his family, battles to save their vacation home and the world from an alien invasion. That same summer, Butler appeared in the starring role of Jordan Gallagher on the popular, but short-lived ABC Family series Ruby & the Rockits, alongside David Cassidy, Patrick Cassidy and his good friend, Alexa Vega.

In February 2010, Butler landed a recurring role as Jones on the CW series Life Unexpected, Later that year, he guest-starred in episodes of the Disney Channel sitcoms Wizards of Waverly Place and Jonas as well as on CSI: Miami and The Defenders. Also in 2010, Butler's Aliens in the Attic co-star Ashley Tisdale invited him to audition for a lead role in the film Sharpay's Fabulous Adventure, a spin-off of Disney's High School Musical franchise that followed the adventures of Sharpay Evans after high school as she tries to get her big break on Broadway. In the film, Butler plays Peyton Leverette, the love interest of Sharpay. Regarding his casting, Butler told Week In Rewind, "I had worked with Ashley once, and then I heard about the movie, because she called me and said, 'Austin, I want you to come and read for the director for this—I think you'd be perfect.' So, I went and met with the director, and it went really well, and I ended up doing the movie." The film was released direct-to-DVD on April 19, 2011.

In 2011, he booked the recurring role of Wilke on the ABC Family series Switched at Birth, debuting on June 27, 2011. In the same year, he signed on to play the lead role of Zack Garvey in the Lifetime TV movie The Bling Ring, made by Dick Clark Productions and directed by Michael Lembeck, based on the burglary group of the same name who targeted the homes of Hollywood's celebrities. The movie was released on September 26, 2011. In January 2012, Butler guest-starred on the NBC comedy Are You There, Chelsea?

2012–2017: Leading roles in television 
In his early twenties, Butler continued to act in teen-oriented television series, but gained greater recognition his starring roles in The Carrie Diaries and later The Shannara Chronicles; he also branched out into new stage and film projects.

In March 2012, Butler was cast in The CW's Sex and the City prequel series The Carrie Diaries to play Sebastian Kydd, a brooding heartthrob attending the same high school as Carrie Bradshaw, played by AnnaSophia Robb. The Carrie Diaries is based on Candace Bushnell's novel by the same name and follows Bradshaw's life in the 1980s as a teenager in New York City. The show was cancelled after two seasons.

In April 2014, it was announced that Butler had joined the cast of the play Death of the Author at the Geffen Playhouse in Los Angeles. He played the role of Bradley, a pre-law student with a double major in political science and math, and is set to graduate from a wealthy university. The play is directed by Bart DeLorenzo and written by Steven Drukman. Following previews on May 20, 2014, the play ran from May 28 to June 29.

Butler then joined the cast of Arrow in the recurring role of Chase. His character was a DJ and a love interest of Willa Holland's character Thea Queen. He co-starred with Miranda Cosgrove and Tom Sizemore in the 2015 thriller film The Intruders, and appeared in Kevin Smith's 2016 horror-comedy film Yoga Hosers about 15-year-old yoga nuts Colleen Collette and Colleen McKenzie. The films also stars Johnny Depp, Lily-Rose Depp, Harley Quinn Smith and Haley Joel Osment.

In 2016, he began playing the role of Wil Ohmsford in The Shannara Chronicles, MTV's television adaptation of the Terry Brooks novel The Elfstones of Shannara. The series was cancelled after two seasons.

2018–present: Critical acclaim and Elvis 

Butler made his Broadway debut playing Don Parritt, the "lost boy" in The Iceman Cometh, which starred Denzel Washington and David Morse. Previews for the limited run began in March 2018, and the play closed in July 2018. Per Hilton Als' review of the play in The New Yorker: "Although there are many performers in George C. Wolfe's staging of Eugene O'Neill's phenomenal [...] drama, The Iceman Cometh, [...] there is only one actor, and his name is Austin Butler."

In 2019, he appeared in the Quentin Tarantino film Once Upon a Time in Hollywood as a fictional version of Manson Family member Tex Watson. Though he had limited screen time, his performance has been described as "intense" and "brooding". In that same year, Butler was cast as Elvis Presley in Elvis, a biographical film about the singer directed by Baz Luhrmann. The film premiered at the 2022 Cannes Film Festival, where the film received a twelve-minute standing ovation from the audience, the longest at the year's festival. Butler's performance received critical acclaim, as well as praise from the Presley family. He described the part as "the most intimidating thing I've ever done. I honestly didn't sleep for about two years." Butler hosted an episode of Saturday Night Live later that year.

Butler will next star in the war drama miniseries Masters of the Air. He will then play Feyd-Rautha in the science fiction epic Dune: Part Two and will star alongside Tom Hardy and Jodie Comer in Jeff Nichols’s The Bikeriders.

Personal life
Butler enjoys creating and recording music. He taught himself to play guitar at the age of thirteen and piano at sixteen.

He was in a relationship with actress Vanessa Hudgens from 2011 to 2019. Since late 2021, Butler has been in a relationship with model Kaia Gerber.

In 2014, Butler's mother died of duodenal cancer.

Filmography

Film

Television

Theater

Awards and nominations

References

External links

 

1991 births
21st-century American male actors
American child singers
American male child actors
American male film actors
American male television actors
Best Actor AACTA Award winners
Best Actor BAFTA Award winners
Best Drama Actor Golden Globe (film) winners
Living people
Male actors from Anaheim, California
Musicians from Anaheim, California
Singers from California
21st-century American male singers
21st-century American singers
Elvis impersonators